Alain Pointet (4 February 1957 – 21 March 2002) was a sailor from Neuilly-sur-Seine, France. who represented his country at the 1992 Summer Olympics in Barcelona, Spain as crew member in the Soling. With Fabrice Levet and helmsman Marc Bouet they finished in 15th place.

References

External links
 
 
 

1957 births
2002 deaths
French male sailors (sport)
Olympic sailors of France
Sailors at the 1992 Summer Olympics – Soling
Soling class world champions